Dubray may refer to:

People
 Charlotte Dubray (1854–1931), French sculptor
 Juanita Suazo Dubray (born 1930), Native American potter 
 Lionel Dubray (1923–1944),  member of French Resistance during World War II

Other
 Henry-Dubray, French automobile